Robert Theissen (20 July 1906 – 13 February 1963) was a Luxembourgian footballer. He competed in the men's tournament at the 1928 Summer Olympics.

References

External links
 
 

1906 births
1963 deaths
Luxembourgian footballers
Luxembourg international footballers
Olympic footballers of Luxembourg
Footballers at the 1928 Summer Olympics
Sportspeople from Luxembourg City
Association football forwards
CA Spora Luxembourg players